The Kyrbasia (Old Persian: *kurpāsa) was a type of headgear worn by the satraps of the Achaemenid Empire. It was later adopted by several post-Achaemenid dynasties, including the early Arsacids of Parthia, the early Ariarathids of Cappadocia, the Orontids of Sophene, and the Frataraka of Persis.

The kyrbasia is sometimes erroneously referred to as a bashlyk, the Turkic word (başlık in Turkish) for a similar headgear used by Cumans, Kipchaks and Tatars during the Middle Ages.

References

Sources 
 
 
 

Iranian clothing
Greek words and phrases
Parthian Empire
Kingdom of Cappadocia
Achaemenid Empire